Burundi competed at the 2016 Summer Olympics in Rio de Janeiro, Brazil, from 5 to 21 August 2016. This was the nation's sixth consecutive appearance at the Summer Olympics.

The Burundi Olympic Committee sent the nation's largest delegation to the Games. Nine athletes, five men and four women, were selected to the Burundian team across three different sports, with nearly half of them having previously competed at London 2012. Among the Burundian athletes on the team were world indoor champion Francine Niyonsaba, second-place finalist in the women's 800 metres, marathoner Diane Nukuri, and long-distance runner Olivier Irabaruta, who became the nation's flag bearer in the opening ceremony.

Burundi left Rio de Janeiro with its first Olympic medal since the nation's debut in 1996. It was awarded to Niyonsaba, who rebounded from an out-of-podium feat back in London to end Burundi's 20-year drought with a silver in her pet event.

Medalists

Athletics (track and field)
 
Burundian athletes achieved qualifying standards in the following athletics events (up to a maximum of 3 athletes in each event):

Track & road events

Judo
 
Burundi received an invitation from the Tripartite Commission to send a judoka competing in the women's half-lightweight category (52 kg) to the Olympics.

Swimming

Burundi received a Universality invitation from FINA to send two swimmers (one male and one female) to the Olympics.

References

External links

 
 

Nations at the 2016 Summer Olympics
2016
Olympics